The Lyceum Central Student Government, also known as the LYCESGO, is the highest student governing body of Lyceum of the Philippines University-Cavite Campus, located at General Trias, Cavite. It is composed of eight officers and their respective committees. Its principal concern is the promotion of welfare and protection of student rights.

LYCESGO promotes and upholds academic freedom in pursuit of the goal of academic excellence. It advances and carries on the tradition of enlightened nationalism as a basic element of a truly responsive LPU education.

Executive officers

LYCESGO Committees 
The Lyceum Central Student Government, since its formation on 2008, has been recruiting students from the university to be a part of the LYCESGO Committees. The LYCESGO Committees have played a vital and important role in LYCESGO, in its events and programs, and in the whole student body of the university as well. The names of the LYCESGO Committees have been revised for Academic Year 2012 - 2013.

Administrative Affairs Committee
Formerly known as the Executive Committee, the Administrative Affairs Committee is under the supervision of the LYCESGO President. Its main function is to monitor the whole government and report the happenings inside the system. Together with the Committee on Students Welfare, AAC monitors the situation happening in the student body.

Internal Affairs Committee
Formerly known as the Internal Committee, the Internal Affairs Committee is under the supervision of the LYCESGO Vice President for Internal Affairs. Its main function is to supervise all the internal matters in the student body relating on student affairs, campus organization, finance monitoring, fellowship and brotherhood and rules and regulations.

External Relations Committee
Formerly known as the External Committee, the External Relations Committee is under the supervision of the LYCESGO Vice President for External Affairs. Its main function is to take charge of the external relations of LYCESGO, and of the matters pertaining to conventions, ceremonials, programs, public events and awards.

Secretariat Committee
The Secretariat Committee is under the supervision of the LYCESGO Secretary. Its main function is to keep accurate minutes of LYCESGO meetings. The committee, spearheaded by the LYCESGO Secretary shall also be the custodians of the records, documents and papers of LYCESGO, and shall take charge of official correspondence.

Financial Committee
Formerly known as the Financial 1 Committee, the Financial Committee is under the supervision of the LYCESGO Treasurer. Its main function is to keep and accurate and effective record of all receipts and expenses of LYCESGO and shall help the LYCESGO Treasurer in submitting a per-event financial report. All financial matters shall be handled by the committee in full supervision of the LYCESGO Treasurer.

Audit and Evaluation Committee
Formerly known as the Financial 2 Committee, Audit and Evaluation Committee is under the supervision of the LYCESGO Auditor. Its main function is to help the LYCESGO Auditor in auditing the financial reports made by the LYCESGO Treasurer. The Committee shall examine the correctness of the report. In addition, the committee shall evaluate every program and event of LYCESGO and shall pass an Evaluation Report to LYCESGO no later than 2 weeks after the event.

Students Welfare Committee
The Students Welfare Committee is under the supervision of the LYCESGO Business Manager. Its main function is to monitor the situation happening in the student body, with the help of the Administrative Affairs Committee. The Committee shall take charge of mapping out the general activities of LYCESGO. Furthermore, the committee shall prepare all necessary plans and studies the perceived outcome of the event.

Public Information Committee
Formerly known as the Publicity Committee, the Public Information Committee is under the supervision of the LYCESGO Public Relations Officer. Its main function is to take charge in all press releases, publications and public relation activities of LYCESGO.

Notable Projects 
Since its formation on 2008, the Lyceum Central Student Government creates different university-wide and college-based (through the CSG's) activities that mainly focuses on the Recreational, Academic, Social and Environmental aspects of the University.

Lyceum SuperStar
With the goal of discovering new breed of Lycean talents, the 1st Lyceum SuperStar was held last January 21, 2012 at the University Grounds. Parokya ni Edgar gave a ground-breaking performance that was enjoyed by the LPU Community, as well as the outsiders and guests. In the end, Gem Aquino, a freshman from the College of Business Administration was named as the 1st Lyceum SuperStar.

Resort Rock
Resort Rock: Battle of the Bands 2011 was held last January 22, 2011 at the University Grounds. 12 different bands fought for the title but in the end, Function of Ex took home the top prize. Vice Ganda performed live on stage at the last sequence of the show before the awarding.

Acquaintance Party 2k10
Acquaintance Party 2k10 is considered as the most memorable acquaintance party in LPU Cavite and was a joint project of LYCESGO, CAS-SG, CCS-SG and COE-SG. The event featured Callalily as one of the guest performers alongside LPU Cavite student and tween star Louise delos Reyes.

Your Hue, Guess Who, It's You!
This is the 2011 Acquaintance Party that was a joint project of CAS-SG, CoECS-SG and CBA-SG.

CITHM Pirates Night
The 2011 Acquaintance Party/Costume Party of the College of International Tourism and Hospitality Management.

LPU Garage Sale
This project is being spearheaded by LYCESGO annually. The LPU Garage Sale is a week-long event that intends to sell forfeited and second-hand items like books to students in a mega-low price.

Refresh
A three-day tutorial programme spearheaded by LYCESGO and the Lambda Sigma Kappa or the LPU Scholastic Society.

Mr. and Ms. LPU Cavite
Since 2009, LYCESGO has been a major part of the search for the Mr. and Ms. LPU Cavite. This pageant aims to seek for the most beautiful women and most handsome men in the campus that can characterize a good role model among the students of the University and uplift the camaraderie among the colleges of LPU Cavite. Below are the list of the title-holders of the pageant:

NOTE: names marked with * are originally crowned as a runner-up but embodied the title until the next pageant because the then-crowned title holder (marked with **) did not perform his respective duties and responsibilities due to personal or academic reasons.

LYCESGO Echo Seminar
The LYCESGO Echo Seminar happened last September 22, 2011 where the LYCESGO Officers echoed the insights from the different seminars and national conventions they have attended to the other student leaders of the University. Guest speakers of the said event were Mr. Mark M. Javier, (Head, Student Affairs Office), Ms. Deborah May Torrecampo (Guidance Counselor) and Mr. Richardson dR. Mojica (CAS Faculty and Ayala Young Leaders Award recipient)

Other Events
Minor events and Special events that caters to the students needs were also driven and supported by LYCESGO.
 Tugma: Photo Exhibit
 Lagpas: 1st MMA Photoexhibit
 LPU High School Conference
 Tree Growing Commitments
 LPU Induction of Officers
 Freshmen Orientation

LPU Student Organizations 
Aside from LYCESGO, each college also has their respective College Student Government (CSG) and there are other officially recognized student organizations in LPU Cavite. The collective aim of which is to develop responsible and creative student leaders who will eventually assume leadership in their chosen careers. The student organizations encourage activities with clearly established goals and which flow among social, cultural, religious, literary, educational and recreational lines.

College of Arts and Sciences 
 College of Arts and Sciences Student Government (CAS-SG)
 Association of Education Students (ASSETS)
 LPU Legal Studies Society (LSS)
 LPU League of Young Communicators (LPU LYC)

College of Business Administration 
 College of Business Administration Student Government (CBA-SG)
 Junior Philippine Institute of Accountancy - LPU Cavite Chapter (JPIA - LPU Cavite)

College of Engineering, Computer Studies and Architecture 
 College of Engineering, Computer Studies and Architecture Student Government (CoECSA-SG)
 LPU Engineering Students Society (LPUESS)
 Computer Studies Society (CSS)

College of International Tourism and Hospitality Management 
 College of International Tourism and Hospitality Management Student Government (CITHM-SG)
 LPU Guild of Culinary Arts Students (LGCAS)
 LPU International Hospitality Management Society (LIHMS)
 LPU International Travel and Tourism Society (LITTS)
 CITHM Hoteliers Entrepreneurs and Restaurateurs Organization of Exemplified Students (CITHM HEROES)

College of Nursing 

 College of Nursing Student Government (CON-SG)

University-wide Organizations 
 The Laurel Leaf (Official Student Publication of LPU Cavite)
 Graduate Student Council
 Students in Free Enterprise - LPU Cavite Chapter (SIFE - LPU Cavite)
 Lyceum Kuro Neko Anime Club (LYKNEKO)
 Society of United Lyceans for Christ (Souls for Christ)
 Society of United Nations

Arts and Cultural Affairs Department (ArtCAD) 
 LPU Cavite Dance Company
 LPU Harmonic Chorale
 LPU Intense Characters of ON-ramp Students (LPU ICONS)
 LPU Musikeros
 LPU Symphonic Band
 LPU Sining ng Arte at Galaw (LPU SinAG)

Student Political Parties 
There are two known and official student political parties in LPU Cavite.
 Ilustrado
 Kagitingan

References 

 LPU Cavite
 Lyceum Central Student Government

External links
 LPU Cavite
 Lyceum of the Philippines University

Lyceum of the Philippines University
Student government